Wayne Stahl is a Republican member of the Montana Legislature.  He was elected to House District   35 which represents the Saco, Montana area.

References

Living people
Republican Party members of the Montana House of Representatives
People from Phillips County, Montana
Year of birth missing (living people)